The 2019 season was the Denver Broncos' 50th in the National Football League (NFL) and their 60th overall.

This marked the Broncos' first season under new ownership since 1984, as longtime owner Pat Bowlen died during the offseason. The team underwent numerous coaching changes following the end of the 2018 season, as Vic Fangio became the Broncos' third different head coach since 2014. After their first 0–4 start since 1999, the Broncos went 7–5 the rest of the way, finishing at 7–9 and improving on their 6–10 record from 2018; however, they missed the playoffs for a fourth consecutive season. The team struggled with poor offensive performances, ranking in the bottom five in several statistical categories. The team underwent a quarterback carousel, and for a fourth consecutive season, scored 30 or more points only once.

Coaching changes

December 31, 2018: One day after the Broncos' 2018 regular-season finale, head coach Vance Joseph was fired, after posting an 11–21 record in his two seasons as the Broncos' head coach.
January 10: Vic Fangio was named the 17th head coach in Broncos' franchise history, replacing Vance Joseph. This will be Fangio's first head coaching gig after 19 years as a defensive assistant. Fangio previously served as a defensive coordinator with the Carolina Panthers from 1995 to 1998, the Indianapolis Colts from 1999 to 2001, the Houston Texans from 2002 to 2005, the San Francisco 49ers from 2011 to 2014 and the Chicago Bears from 2015 to 2018.
January 14: Mike Munchak was hired as the offensive line coach. Munchak served in the same capacity with the Pittsburgh Steelers from 2014 to 2018.
January 15: Brandon Staley was hired as the outside linebackers coach. Staley served in the same capacity with the Chicago Bears during the previous two seasons (2017–2018), alongside current Broncos' head coach Vic Fangio. Ed Donatell was hired as the defensive coordinator. This will be Donatell's third stint with the Broncos, having coached the defensive backs from 1995 to 1999 and 2009–2010. Donatell also served as a defensive backs alongside Vic Fangio during the previous eight seasons—with the San Francisco 49ers from 2011 to 2014 and the Chicago Bears from 2015 to 2018.
January 16: Rich Scangarello, who spent 2017 and 2018 as the San Francisco 49ers' quarterbacks coach, was hired as the offensive coordinator.
January 17: Wade Harman was hired as the tight ends coach. Harman worked in the same capacity with the Atlanta Falcons from 2015 to 2018. Renaldo Hill was hired as the defensive backs coach. This will be Hill's second season as an assistant coach, having worked in the same capacity with the Miami Dolphins in 2018. As a player, Hill was also a Broncos' safety from 2009 to 2010.
January 22: Chris Kuper, who was a Broncos' offensive lineman from 2006 to 2013, was hired as an assistant offensive line coach. Kuper spent the previous three season (2016–2018) as a Miami Dolphins' offensive assistant.
January 31: T. C. McCartney was hired as the quarterbacks coach. McCartney served as an offensive assistant with the San Francisco 49ers in 2015, 2017 and 2018—the latter two seasons alongside current offensive coordinator Rich Scangarello. McCartney replaced Klint Kubiak, who accepted the same position with the Minnesota Vikings two weeks earlier.

Front office changes
On January 14, Gary Kubiak, the team's senior personnel advisor during the previous two seasons, departed for an assistant head coach/offensive advisor position with the Minnesota Vikings.

Death of owner Pat Bowlen
On June 13, owner Pat Bowlen died at the age of 75, following a long battle with Alzheimer's disease. Bowlen, who had served as the team's majority owner since 1984, relinquished control of the team prior to the 2014 season after privately battling the disease five years prior. This resulted in Bowlen transferring control to a three-person group known as "The Pat Bowlen Trust," consisting of team president/CEO Joe Ellis, team counsel Rich Slivka and Denver attorney Mary Kelly. Bowlen was the fastest owner to reach 300 wins, and during Bowlen's 35 seasons as majority owner, the team posted the league's second-best winning percentage (354–240–1, .596), behind only the New England Patriots. The team also reached seven Super Bowls, winning three (XXXII, XXXIII and 50) and suffered a league-low seven losing seasons. Bowlen's death occurred two months before he was inducted into the Pro Football Hall of Fame.

One year before Pat Bowlen's death, two of his children expressed interest in succeeding as the Broncos' controlling owner—Beth Bowlen Wallace and Brittany Bowlen. On December 2, Brittany Bowlen, 29, made her return to the Broncos' organization with a senior management position of vice president of strategic initiatives, following the end of her employment with McKinsey & Company. Ellis stated that selling the team remained an option, even with Brittany Bowlen's return to the organization.

Roster changes

Free agents

Unrestricted

Restricted and exclusive-rights

Signings

Trades
February 13: The Broncos agreed in principle to trade for former Baltimore Ravens' quarterback Joe Flacco in exchange for their 2019 fourth-round selection.
March 7: The Broncos traded quarterback Case Keenum and a 2020 seventh-round selection to the Washington Redskins in exchange for the Redskins' 2020 sixth-round selection. This trade, along with the aforementioned trade for Joe Flacco, became official on March 13—the first day of the 2019 league year.
April 27: The Broncos acquired linebacker Dekoda Watson as part of a trade that sent their fifth-round selection to the San Francisco 49ers—see draft trades below. This would have been Watson's second stint with the Broncos—he previously played one season with the Broncos in 2016 before signing with the 49ers in 2017; however, he was later released on August 26.
August 30: The Broncos traded their 2020 sixth-round selection to the New England Patriots in exchange for cornerback Duke Dawson and the Patriots' 2020 seventh-round selection.
October 22: The Broncos traded wide receiver Emmanuel Sanders and their 2020 fifth-round selection to the San Francisco 49ers in exchange for the 49ers' 2020 third-and fourth-round selections.

Departures

Draft

The Broncos did not have selections in the fourth or seventh rounds—see draft trades below.

Draft trades

Undrafted free agents
All undrafted free agents were signed after the 2019 NFL Draft concluded on April 27, unless noted otherwise.

Suspensions
On December 17, safety Kareem Jackson was suspended for the final two games of the 2019 season for violating the league's Policy and Program on Substances of Abuse. Jackson's suspension stems from a September 19 arrest for driving while ability impaired, which he promptly reported to the team to be investigated by the NFL.

Injuries
May 14: Guard Nico Falah was placed on injured reserve after rupturing his Achilles tendon during organized team activities (OTAs).
August 4: Defensive end Billy Winn was placed on injured reserve after tearing his triceps during the team's win over the Atlanta Falcons in the Pro Football Hall of Fame Game.
August 8: Undrafted rookie tight end Austin Fort tore the ACL in his knee during the team's second preseason game at the Seattle Seahawks, and was placed on injured reserve.
September 2: Two days after trimming their roster to a league-mandated 53 players, the Broncos placed three players on injured reserve: quarterback Drew Lock, running back Theo Riddick and tight end Jake Butt. Lock, the team's second-round draft selection, sprained the thumb on his throwing hand during the team's fourth preseason game against the San Francisco 49ers. The Broncos used one of two designation for return (DFR) tags on Lock (the other on wide receiver Tim Patrick), and he was later reinstated to the active roster on November 30. Riddick injured his shoulder during the team's second preseason game at the Seattle Seahawks. Butt underwent a follow-up surgery following a setback in the recovery from an ACL tear in his knee that he suffered during the 2018 season.
September 11: Wide receiver Tim Patrick was placed on injured reserve due to a fractured hand that he suffered during the team's Week 1 loss to the Oakland Raiders. He was later given a designation for return on October 30, and began practicing that same day. Patrick later returned to the active roster for the team's Week 11 game at the Minnesota Vikings.
September 25: The Broncos announced that cornerback Bryce Callahan would initially miss at least four weeks due to a procedure on his injured foot. Callahan initially suffered the injury as a member of the Chicago Bears during Week 14 of the 2018 season, and experienced complications from the surgery that he underwent and missed the entire preseason. However, Callahan was later placed on the season-ending injured reserve on November 15.
September 29: Linebacker Bradley Chubb suffered a partially torn ACL in his knee during the team's Week 4 loss to the Jacksonville Jaguars, and was placed on injured reserve two days later (October 1).
October 8: Cornerback De'Vante Bausby was placed on injured reserve, two days after suffering a cervical sprain during the team's Week 5 win over the Los Angeles Chargers. Teammate A. J. Johnson inadvertently collided with Bausby while making a tackle.
November 1: Quarterback Joe Flacco and linebacker Corey Nelson were each placed on injured reserve. Four days earlier (October 28), the team announced that Flacco sustained a herniated disc in his neck, one day after the team's Week 8 loss to the Indianapolis Colts (October 27), and was subsequently ruled out for the Broncos' Week 9 game vs. the Cleveland Browns. Nelson suffered torn biceps during the loss to the Colts.
November 17: Fullback Andy Janovich was placed on injured reserve, two days after he dislocated his elbow during the team's Week 11 loss to the Minnesota Vikings.
December 3: Defensive end Derek Wolfe was placed on injured reserve, two days after dislocating his elbow during the team's Week 13 win over the Los Angeles Chargers.
December 24: Defensive end Adam Gotsis was placed on injured reserve, following knee surgery that caused him to miss the Broncos' Week 16 win over the Detroit Lions.

Staff

Final roster

Preseason
The Broncos played the Atlanta Falcons in the Pro Football Hall of Fame Game on Thursday, August 1, at Tom Benson Hall of Fame Stadium in Canton, Ohio. The Broncos were represented by late owner Pat Bowlen, who died on June 13, as well as cornerback Champ Bailey. It marked the Broncos' fourth appearance in the game and the first since 2004, when John Elway was inducted into the Hall of Fame.

Regular season

Schedule
The Broncos' schedule was announced on April 17. This marked the first time since 2010 in which the Broncos opened the season on the road.

Note: Intra-division opponents are in bold text.

Game summaries

Week 1: at Oakland Raiders

In the season opener, the Broncos made their final visit to Oakland, prior to the Raiders' relocation to Las Vegas for 2020. The Broncos fell behind 14–0 in the first half against the Raiders on Monday Night Football. On the game's opening drive, Raiders' quarterback Derek Carr threw an 8-yard touchdown pass to wide receiver Tyrell Williams, and running back Josh Jacobs added a 2-yard touchdown run in the second quarter. Broncos placekicker Brandon McManus missed short on a 63-yard field goal attempt just before halftime. The Broncos reached the red zone on their first three possessions of the second half, but were forced to settle for field goals by McManus on each drive—two 26-yarders in the third quarter and a 39-yarder midway through the fourth quarter. Wide receiver DaeSean Hamilton dropped a potential touchdown pass on the second drive. Following the second field goal, the Raiders increased their lead to 21–6, with Jacobs' second touchdown run of the game (a 4-yarder), and then to 24–9, with a 29-yard field goal by placekicker Daniel Carlson at the 4:41 mark of the third quarter. After three red zone attempts that all resulted in short field goals, the Broncos finally reached the end zone with 2:18 remaining in the fourth quarter. Joe Flacco, in his debut as the Broncos' starting quarterback, connected on a 1–yard touchdown pass to wide receiver Emmanuel Sanders to narrow the Raiders' lead to 24–16. However, the Broncos were unable to prevent the Raiders from running out the clock. With the loss, the Broncos opened the season at 0–1 for the first time since 2011, which was also a loss to the Raiders on Monday Night Football.

Week 2: vs. Chicago Bears

In the Broncos' home opener, the only points of the first half came by way of field goals—a 43-yarder by Broncos' placekicker Brandon McManus on the game's opening drive, and 43- and 52-yarders by Bears' placekicker Eddy Piñeiro in the second quarter. The Bears increased their lead to 13–3 late in the third quarter, with running back David Montgomery diving for a 1-yard touchdown. For a second consecutive week, the Broncos were held without a touchdown for the first three-quarters, and were once again plagued by red-zone woes. The Broncos reached the red zone early in the fourth quarter, but were forced to settle on a 32-yard field goal by McManus to pull to within a 13–6 deficit. After forcing a Bears' punt, the Broncos were attempting to tie the game and reached the Bears' 2-yard line with 4:51 remaining; however, quarterback Joe Flacco was intercepted by Bears' cornerback Kyle Fuller. The Broncos forced another Bears' punt, and got the football back at their own 38-yard line with 2:48 remaining in the game. After burning all of their timeouts, the Broncos finally reached the end zone with 37 seconds remaining, with Flacco connecting with wide receiver Emmanuel Sanders on a 7-yard touchdown pass. The Broncos were initially planning to go for the two-point conversion, but a delay-of-game penalty pushed them back five yards. The Broncos then attempted the game-tying extra point, which McManus missed wide right; however, Bears' cornerback Buster Skrine was whistled for an offsides penalty. The Broncos attempted another two-point conversion, which was successful, with a Flacco completion to Sanders. The Bears had one final drive, which began at their own 25-yard line with 31 seconds remaining. On the first play, Broncos' linebacker Bradley Chubb was whistled for a questionable roughing the passer penalty on Bears' quarter Mitchell Trubisky, which added 15 yards to a 5-yard completion to tight end Trey Burton. After three consecutive incomplete passes and a 5-yard penalty for having too many men on the field, the Bears faced a 4th-and-15 from their own 40-yard line. Trubisky completed a 25-yard pass to wide receiver Allen Robinson in the middle of the field to the Broncos' 35-yard line, and the Bears' final timeout was called with one second remaining. This set up the game-winning 53-yard field goal by Piñeiro as time expired.

Week 3: at Green Bay Packers

On the game's opening drive, Packers quarterback Aaron Rodgers launched a 40-yard touchdown pass to wide receiver Marquez Valdes-Scantling. Broncos return specialist Diontae Spencer returned the ensuing kickoff to the Packers' 43-yard line, but the Broncos' offense went three-and-out on their initial possession. After forcing a Green Bay punt, the Broncos pulled even early in the second quarter, with running back Phillip Lindsay rushing for a 1-yard touchdown. The next two scoring plays came from each placekicker—a 42-yard field goal by the Packers' Mason Crosby, followed by one from 30 yards by the Broncos' Brandon McManus. The Broncos suffered turnovers on two of their next three possessions, and the Packers capitalized as a result. First, Broncos quarterback Joe Flacco was strip-sacked by Packers linebacker Preston Smith at the Denver 5-yard line. The Packers reclaimed the lead just before halftime, with a 7-yard touchdown run by running back Aaron Jones. Then early in the third quarter, linebacker Jaire Alexander forced a fumble off Broncos tight end Noah Fant at the Denver 37-yard line, and Jones' second rushing touchdown—from 1 yard out—increased the Packers' lead to 24–10. The Broncos responded with a 12-play, 75-yard drive, with Lindsay's second 1-yard touchdown run—this one on a 4th-and-goal. However, McManus hit the left upright on his extra point attempt, leaving the score at 24–16. After forcing the Packers to punt, the Broncos advanced to the Green Bay 38-yard line late in the third quarter; however, Flacco was intercepted by safety Darnell Savage Jr. The Packers increased their lead to 27–16 with less than 6 minutes to play, thanks to a 41-yard field goal by Crosby. The Broncos had two more possessions, but could not reach midfield on either drive—both ending with Flacco getting sacked and turning over the football on downs. Flacco was sacked six times, and for a third consecutive game, the Broncos' defense failed to record a sack or force a turnover. The Broncos suffered their first 0–3 start since 1999. With the loss, the Broncos dropped to 0–6–1 in road games against the Packers, going 0–5 at Lambeau Field and 0–1–1 in two meetings in Milwaukee. To date, the Packers remain as the only team that the Broncos have never defeated on the road in their franchise history.

Week 4: vs. Jacksonville Jaguars

The Broncos grabbed a 17–3 lead over the Jaguars by the second quarter, with quarterback Joe Flacco throwing a pair of touchdown passes—a 25-yarder to tight end Noah Fant in the first quarter followed by a 7-yarder to wide receiver Courtland Sutton in the second quarter, and placekicker Brandon McManus adding a 33-yard field goal. The Broncos reached the Jaguars' 33-yard line 1:05 remaining until halftime, and were attempting to add to their lead; however, Flacco was intercepted by Jaguars' safety Ronnie Harrison, who advance the football to the Broncos' 43-yard line. This set up a 40-yard field goal by placekicker Josh Lambo just before halftime. On the opening possession of the second half, the Jaguars pulled to within a 17–13 deficit, with a 16-play, 75-yard drive, culminating in a 7-yard touchdown pass from quarterback Gardner Minshew to running back Ryquell Armstead. After the Broncos went three-and-out on their first possession of the second half, the Jaguars took a 20–17 lead, with Minshew, starting in place of the injured Nick Foles, connecting on an 18-yard touchdown pass to tight end James O'Shaughnessy. The key play of the drive was an 81-yard run by running back Leonard Fournette. With 9:54 remaining in the fourth quarter, the Jaguars assembled a 13-play, 78-yard drive, with a 34-yard field goal by Lambo to increase the Jaguars lead to 23–17 with three minutes remaining. Six plays later, and with only one timeout remaining, the Broncos took a 24–23 lead, with Flacco throwing his third touchdown pass of the game—an 8-yarder to Sutton with 1:38 remaining. However, for the second time in three weeks, the Broncos were unable to prevent a game-winning drive by their opponent. On the second play of the Jaguars' game-winning drive, linebacker Von Miller was whistled for a roughing the passer penalty after the Broncos forced their first fumble of the season. Lambo kicked the game-winning 32-yard field goal as time expired. After failing to record a sack in their first three games, the Broncos sacked Minshew five times, including two by Von Miller, who reached 100 career sacks in his 124th game, the fourth-fastest player to reach that landmark. With the loss, the Broncos suffered their first 0–4 start since 1999.

Week 5: at Los Angeles Chargers

The Broncos jumped out to a 14–0 lead over the Chargers on their first two offensive possessions, courtesy of a 4-yard touchdown run by running back Phillip Lindsay, followed by a 70-yard touchdown pass from quarterback Joe Flacco to wide receiver Courtland Sutton. The Broncos reached the Chargers' 29-yard line on their third possession, but Flacco was strip-sacked by linebacker Uchenna Nwosu on the first play of the second quarter, with linebacker Jatavis Brown recovering the fumble. The Chargers managed to get to the Denver 16-yard line on their ensuing possession, but quarterback Philip Rivers was flagged for intentional grounding on a 3rd-and-5, with the penalty pushing them back to the 30-yard line. The ensuing 48-yard field goal attempt from Chase McLaughlin was blocked by Broncos' defensive end Dre'Mont Jones. The Broncos increased their lead to 17–0 on their next possession, with a 40-yard field goal by Brandon McManus. The Chargers reached the Broncos' 1-yard line with seven seconds remaining before halftime, with Rivers completing a short pass to running back Austin Ekeler near the left sideline. However, Broncos' safety Kareem Jackson forced a fumble before Ekeler could break the plane of the goal line near the pylon, and the football went out of the corner of the end zone for a touchback, keeping the Chargers scoreless.

After a series of punts to start the second half, the two teams exchanged turnovers. First, with the Broncos backed up near their own goal line, Flacco was intercepted on a deflected pass by linebacker Kyzir White, giving the Chargers a very short field at the 7-yard line. Three plays later, the Broncos returned the favor, with linebacker A. J. Johnson intercepting Rivers in the end zone for a touchback. After the Broncos went three-and-out, the Chargers finally got on the scoreboard with 49 seconds remaining in the third quarter, with Desmond King returning a punt 51 yards for a touchdown—the Chargers' only touchdown of the game. After McManus missed wide left on a 54-yard field goal attempt, the Chargers narrowed the Broncos' lead to 17–10, with a 45-yard field goal by McLaughlin. Following an exchange of punts, a 46-yard field goal by McManus increased the Broncos' lead to 20–10 at the two-minute warning. The Chargers attempted a rally, with a 32-yard field goal by McLaughlin with only 15 seconds remaining. However, the onside kick attempt was unsuccessful, giving the Broncos their first win of the season and snapping an eight-game losing streak dating back to last season. In addition, the Broncos earned their 500th win in franchise history and avoided their first ever 0–5 start. This was also the third and final meeting between the two teams at Dignity Health Sports Park—the Chargers' temporary home field, prior to the Chargers' move to SoFi Stadium in Inglewood for the 2020 season.

Week 6: vs. Tennessee Titans

The Broncos' defense recorded seven sacks, three interceptions, and for the second consecutive week, did not allow an offensive touchdown, in a 16–0 shutout win over the Titans. The only points of the first half came courtesy of two field goals by placekicker Brandon McManus—a 31-yarder in the first quarter and a 53-yarder in the second. A 2-yard touchdown run by running back Phillip Lindsay increased the Broncos' lead to 13–0 late in the third quarter. Titans quarterback Marcus Mariota was benched midway through the third quarter following a poor performance that included two interceptions, and was replaced by backup quarterback Ryan Tannehill. The Titans' offense did not advance past midfield until the fourth quarter, and reached the Broncos' 13-yard line with 9:22 remaining; however, Tannehill was sacked by defensive end DeMarcus Walker on a 4th-and-4. A 48-yard field goal by McManus increased the Broncos' lead to 16–0 with 4:57 remaining in the game. The Titans had one last offensive possession, and reached the Broncos' 5-yard line at the two-minute warning. Following an offensive holding penalty, a 10-yard sack of Tannehill by defensive tackle Derek Wolfe and an 18-yard pass completion from Tannehill to tight end Delanie Walker to the 12-yard line, Tannehill was intercepted by cornerback Kareem Jackson near the goal line, ending the Titans' rally attempt and preserving the shutout. Both teams' offenses went a combined 4-for-28 (.143) on third down—2-for-14 by each team.   With this win the Broncos became only the second team originating in the American Football League to reach 500 career wins.

Week 7: vs. Kansas City Chiefs

The Broncos assembled a 10-play, 75-yard drive on the game's opening possession, which culminated in a 1-yard touchdown run by running back Royce Freeman. The drive was aided by a pair of penalties against the Chiefs' defense on two third-down plays. The Broncos elected for a two-point conversion attempt at the 1-yard line following an offside penalty against the Chiefs on the extra-point attempt. However, running back Phillip Lindsay was denied by the Chiefs' defense, and it was all downhill for the Broncos after that, as the Chiefs scored the final 30 points of the game. First, quarterback Patrick Mahomes connected on a 21-yard touchdown pass to wide receiver Mecole Hardman, which was followed by a pair of field goals by placekicker Harrison Butker—a 33-yarder near the end of the first quarter and a 20-yarder midway through the second. Between the two field goals, Mahomes left the game with a dislocated patella and Broncos' punter Colby Wadman was sacked on a fake punt attempt. The Chiefs' defense then strip-sacked Broncos' quarterback Joe Flacco, with linebacker Reggie Ragland returning it 5 yards for a touchdown and a 20–6 halftime lead. Mahomes was replaced by backup quarterback Matt Moore, who launched a 57-yard touchdown pass to wide receiver Tyreek Hill in the third quarter, and Butker later added a 39-yard field goal in the fourth. After Broncos' placekicker Brandon McManus missed wide right on a 45-yard field goal attempt late in the second quarter, the Broncos' offense did not advance past the midfield line for the remainder of the game. In addition, Flacco was sacked nine times by the Chiefs' defense, and for a second consecutive week, the Broncos' offense performed poorly on third down, going 1-for-13 (.077).

Week 8: at Indianapolis Colts

After a scoreless first quarter, the Broncos failed to capitalize on two red zone opportunities, settling for a pair of short field goals by placekicker Brandon McManus in the second quarter—from 21 and 29 yards out. Colts' placekicker Adam Vinatieri, who missed wide-right on a 45-yard field goal attempt on the game's opening drive, kicked a 55-yard field goal at the end of the first half. The Broncos took the opening possession of the second half, and increased their lead to 13–3, with running back Royce Freeman rushing for a 4-yard touchdown. However, the Broncos were held scoreless for the remainder of the game. After a 45-yard field goal by Vinatieri, Colts' running back Marlon Mack rushed for a 10-yard touchdown. However, Vinatieri missed wide-left on the extra-point attempt, keeping the score at 13–12. After an exchange of punts, which included the Broncos nearly blocking a punt in the Colts' end zone, Broncos' defensive end Derek Wolfe forced a fumble off Colts' quarterback Jacoby Brissett near midfield and midway through the fourth quarter; however, the Broncos were unable to capitalize, going three-and-out. The Broncos failed to convert a 3rd-and-5 at the Colts' 43-yard line at the two-minute warning, giving the Colts the football on their own 11-yard line. On the first play, Brissett evaded a sack by linebacker Von Miller, and completed a 35-yard pass to wide receiver T. Y. Hilton on the right sideline that was reviewed, but upheld by instant replay. A personal foul horse-collar tackle penalty on linebacker A. J. Johnson added 15-yards to a 5-yard pass completion from Brissett to running back Nyheim Hines. Four plays later, Vinatieri atoned for the aforementioned missed field goal and extra-point attempts by kicking the go-ahead 51-yard field goal with 26 seconds remaining. Without any timeouts, the Broncos had two offensive plays at their own 24-yard line, but failed to gain any yardage on either play. With the loss, the Broncos started with a 2–6 record for only the third time in franchise history—1983 and 2010 are the other two seasons.

Week 9: vs. Cleveland Browns

Two days after quarterback Joe Flacco was placed on injured reserve, backup quarterback Brandon Allen got the start for the Broncos. He threw two touchdown passes—the first one to wide receiver Courtland Sutton for 21 yards in the first quarter, and the second one a 75-yarder to tight end Noah Fant early in the second quarter. The Broncos' defense yielded four red zone opportunities by the Browns' offense in the second quarter, but forced the Browns to settle for four field goals by placekicker Austin Seibert in the second quarter—the third one occurred after the Browns' defense forced a fumble deep in Broncos' territory. Broncos' placekicker Brandon McManus added a 43-yard field goal just after the two-minute warning for a 17–12 halftime lead. The Broncos' defense subdued the Browns on another red zone opportunity at the 5:23 mark of the third quarter, with linebackers Todd Davis and Von Miller denying Browns' quarterback Baker Mayfield on a 4th-and-1 at the 5-yard line. The Browns unsuccessfully challenged the ruling on the field, and seven plays later, the Broncos increased their lead to 24–12, with a 30-yard run by running back Phillip Lindsay late in the third quarter. The Browns responded on their next drive, and with 10:53 remaining in the fourth quarter, Mayfield connected with wide receiver Jarvis Landry on a 9-yard touchdown to narrow the Broncos' lead to 24–19. The drive was aided by a defensive pass interference penalty on cornerback Chris Harris, Jr. on a 3rd-and-7 at the Broncos' 19-yard line. After forcing a Broncos' punt, the Browns reached the Broncos' 28-yard line with 3:23 remaining in the game and no timeouts, facing a 4th-and-4. However, Mayfield's pass intended for Landry was incomplete, and the Broncos' ran out the clock, thanks to a critical third-down conversion by Lindsay on a wildcat formation. With the win, the Broncos entered their bye week with a 3–6 record, and improved to a 24–6 all-time record vs. the Browns (including the playoffs).

Week 11: at Minnesota Vikings

The Broncos took a 10–0 lead in the first quarter, with a 47-yard field goal by placekicker Brandon McManus and a 3-yard touchdown pass from quarterback Brandon Allen to tight end Troy Fumagalli. The lead increased to 17–0 early in the second quarter, with a 1-yard touchdown run by fullback Andy Janovich, who later left the game before halftime with a serious elbow injury. Linebacker Shelby Harris forced a strip sack and fumble off Vikings' quarterback Kirk Cousins at the Vikings' 17-yard line; however, the Broncos were forced to settle on a 29-yard field goal by McManus with one minute before halftime. The Broncos recovered a fumble off return specialist Ameer Abdullah on the ensuing kickoff, and were hoping to increase their lead prior to halftime; however, on the next play, Allen was intercepted by safety Andrew Sendejo near the goal line.

The second half was dominated by the Vikings, as they scored a touchdown on all four of their second half possessions. On the opening possession, Cousins connected on a 10-yard touchdown pass to tight end Irv Smith Jr. After a 41-yard field goal by McManus increased the Broncos lead to 23–7, the Vikings pulled to within a 23–20 deficit within the first five minutes of the fourth quarter. First, running back Dalvin Cook rushed for a 3-yard touchdown (with an unsuccessful two-point conversion attempt), and after a forcing a three-and-out by the Broncos' offense, Cousins launched a 54-yard touchdown pass to wide receiver Stefon Diggs. After McManus missed wide right on a 43-yard field goal attempt, the Vikings took their first lead of the game, with Cousins' third touchdown pass—a 32-yarder to tight end Kyle Rudolph with 6:10 remaining in the game. The Broncos began the last possession at their own 40-yard line, and with three fourth-down conversions, methodically marched to the Vikings' 4-yard line with only 10 seconds remaining in the game. However, three consecutive pass attempts into the end zone by Allen fell incomplete, ending the game.

Week 12: at Buffalo Bills

The Broncos' offense gained only 134 total yards and the defense surrendered 244 rushing yards, in a 20–3 loss. Following a pair of field goals by Bills' placekicker Steven Hauschka—a 39-yarder in the first quarter and a 23-yarder in the second quarter, Broncos' safety Justin Simmons intercepted a pass off Bills' quarterback Josh Allen. However, the Broncos' failed to capitalize, as quarterback Brandon Allen was intercepted by cornerback Tre'Davious White at the Bills' 8-yard line late in the second quarter. After an 18-yard touchdown pass from Josh Allen to wide receiver Cole Beasley gave the Bills a 13–0 lead on the first possession of the second half, the Broncos' only scoring play was a 45-yard field goal by placekicker Brandon McManus midway through the third quarter. The Broncos' offense did not advance past their own 35-yard line for the remainder of the game, and Josh Allen added another touchdown pass—a 34-yarder to wide receiver John Brown.

Week 13: vs. Los Angeles Chargers

Quarterback Drew Lock, the Broncos' second-round draft selection, made his NFL debut, after missing the first eleven games due to a sprained thumb sustained during the preseason. Lock replaced Brandon Allen, who started the previous three games, and Lock connected on a pair of touchdowns to wide receiver Courtland Sutton in the first quarter—a 26- and a 5-yarder. The latter touchdown occurred after an interception of Chargers' quarterback Philip Rivers. Following an exchange of field goals—a 30-yarder by the Chargers' Michael Badgley and a 31-yarder by the Broncos' Brandon McManus, Rivers threw a 30-yard touchdown pass to running back Austin Ekeler to narrow the Broncos' lead to 17–10 just before halftime. Following a scoreless third quarter, a 36-yard touchdown pass from Rivers to wide receiver Keenan Allen tied the game at 17–17 early in the fourth quarter. On the Broncos' next possession, Lock was intercepted by Chargers' linebacker Denzel Perryman; however, the Chargers gained only one yard and failed to capitalize, as Badgley hit the left upright on a 55-yard field goal attempt. The Broncos re-gained the lead with a 52-yard field goal by McManus at the 4:31 mark of the fourth quarter. However, the Chargers responded, as Badgley redeemed himself with a 46-yard field goal with only 19 seconds remaining in the game. The Broncos had one final possession, and instead of kneeling down for an overtime period, Lock attempted a deep pass to Sutton that was incomplete at the Chargers' 35-yard line with only three seconds remaining. However, Chargers' cornerback Casey Hayward was flagged for pass interference, and after the Chargers called their final timeout, McManus kicked the game-winning 53-yard field goal as time expired.

Week 14: at Houston Texans

Quarterback Drew Lock threw for 309 yards and three touchdown passes, and the defense forced three turnovers, including a 70-yard fumble return for a touchdown by cornerback Kareem Jackson, in a surprising and dominating win over the Texans. The Broncos built a 38–3 lead after a 1-yard touchdown run by running back Phillip Lindsay early in the third quarter, despite surrendering three-second-half touchdowns to Texans' quarterback Deshaun Watson—one passing and two rushing. The Broncos snapped a 21-game streak of failing to reach 30 or more points that dated back to last season, and this was the only game during the 2019 season in which the Broncos scored 30 or more points. In addition, Lock became the first rookie quarterback in NFL history to achieve 300 passing yards and three touchdown passes in his first road start.

Week 15: at Kansas City Chiefs

The same offensive struggles that had plagued the Broncos all season, prior to their Week 14 win over the Texans, resurfaced in snowy conditions vs. the Chiefs at Arrowhead Stadium. The Broncos' only managed a 32-yard field goal by placekicker Brandon McManus late in the second quarter, after falling behind 12–0. Chiefs' quarterback Patrick Mahomes connected on a pair of touchdown passes to wide receiver Tyreek Hill—a 41-yarder on their opening possession and a 5-yarder in the third quarter that put the game out of reach. With the loss, the Broncos were officially eliminated from postseason contention.

Week 16: vs. Detroit Lions

The Broncos fell behind 10–0 to the Lions, after a 26-yard field goal by placekicker Matt Prater in the first quarter, followed in the second quarter by return specialist Jamal Agnew returning a punt 64 yards for a touchdown. The Broncos responded, with a 1-yard touchdown run by running back Royce Freeman and a 34-yard field goal by placekicker Brandon McManus—the latter just before halftime. After a 26-yard field goal by McManus gave the Broncos a 13–10 lead, the Lions re-claimed the lead later in the third quarter, with quarterback David Blough, starting in place of the injured Matthew Stafford, connecting on a 3-yard touchdown pass to wide receiver Kenny Golladay. However, the Broncos took the lead for good early in the fourth quarter, with quarterback Drew Lock completing a shovel pass to wide receiver DaeSean Hamilton for a 3-yard touchdown. The Broncos later added to their lead, with a 27-yard touchdown run by running back Phillip Lindsay with 6:39 remaining in the game. The Lions' offense did not advance past their own 30-yard line on either of their final two possessions.

Week 17: vs. Oakland Raiders

In the Broncos' season finale, they faced the Oakland Raiders for the final time—home or away—prior to the Raiders' relocation to Las Vegas for 2020. The Raiders got on the scoreboard early in the second quarter, with a 23-yard field goal by placekicker Daniel Carlson, who missed wide left on a 39-yard attempt midway through the first quarter. The Broncos responded, with a 43-yard field goal by placekicker Brandon McManus. The Raiders faced a 3rd-and-goal at the Broncos' 5-yard line on their next possession, and a 5-yard pass from quarterback Derek Carr to wide receiver Hunter Renfrow was initially ruled a touchdown. However, after a booth review, Renfrow was ruled down at the 1-yard line. On the very next play, fullback Alec Ingold was stopped inches short of the goal line on fourth down by the Broncos' defense. The Raiders thought Ingold had broken the plane of the goal line, and unsuccessfully challenged the ruling of the play, resulting in a turnover on downs. After a fumble on the Raiders' next possession, the Broncos took advantage, with a 1-yard touchdown pass from quarterback Drew Lock to tight end Andrew Beck just before halftime.

The Broncos increased their lead to 16–3, with a pair of field goals by McManus—a 49-yarder in the third quarter, followed by a 51-yarder on the first play of the fourth quarter. The Raiders responded with a pair of field goals by Carlson—from 33 and 28 yards out; the latter occurring after a fumble by Lock. After a Raiders' turnover on downs at their own 27-yard line, the Broncos attempted to either the run out the clock or add to their lead. However, after a false start and an unnecessary roughness penalty on offensive tackle Garett Bolles pushes the Broncos back 15 yards, McManus missed wide-right on a 57-yard field goal attempt, giving the Raiders one last possession at their own 47-yard line. On the eighth play of the drive, the Raiders finally reached the end zone, with a 3-yard pass from Carr to Renfrow to pull to within a 16–15 deficit with 11 seconds remaining in the game. Instead on sending the game to overtime, the Raiders decided to go for a potential game-winning two-point conversion attempt. However, Carr's pass attempt was batted down by nose tackle Shelby Harris, and the Raiders' ensuing onside kick attempt was unsuccessful, giving the Broncos the win.

Quarterback carousel
For the second time in three seasons, the Broncos underwent multiple changes at the quarterback position. The team traded for former Baltimore Ravens' quarterback Joe Flacco during the offseason. However, he threw for 1,822 yards and only six touchdown passes, prior to discovery of a herniated disc in his neck that ended his season following the team's Week 8 loss to the Indianapolis Colts. Backup quarterback Brandon Allen took over, beginning with their Week 9 win over the Cleveland Browns, and in three starts, threw for 515 yards and three touchdown passes. Following a poor performance during the Broncos' Week 12 loss to the Buffalo Bills, Allen was replaced by Drew Lock, the team's second-round draft selection. Lock missed the first eleven games due to a sprained thumb that he sustained during the preseason, and he made his NFL debut on December 1, leading the Broncos to a 4–1 record in their last five games. Lock became the Broncos' seventh different starting quarterback since Week 9 of the 2017 season.

Standings

Division

Conference

Statistics

Team leaders

League rankings

Awards and honors

Pro Bowl and All-Pro selections
Linebacker Von Miller was selected to the 2020 Pro Bowl, while wide receiver Courtland Sutton, safety Kareem Jackson and return specialist Diontae Spencer were named alternates. Sutton was later added to the Pro Bowl roster as an injury replacement for Houston Texans' wide receiver DeAndre Hopkins, becoming the fastest wide receiver in Broncos' franchise history to make his first Pro Bowl—in his second season. Safety Justin Simmons was voted to the 2019 All-Pro Team and named to the Second Team.

Other news and notes
On September 4, Broncos Stadium at Mile High was rebranded as Empower Field at Mile High. The Broncos had been seeking a long-term naming rights partner for their home field since sporting goods retailer Sports Authority went bankrupt in 2016. Empower Retirement, a retirement plan provider that is based in Denver, had served as a team sponsor since 2015, with the Broncos agreeing to terms on a 21-year deal that will run through 2039, though financial terms were undisclosed. This marks the third naming rights change for the Broncos' home field, following "Invesco Field at Mile High" (2001–2010), "Sports Authority Field at Mile High" (2011–2017) and "Broncos Stadium at Mile High"—the latter of which was used on a temporary basis for the 2018 season.

References

External links

The Denver Post – Complete Broncos Coverage 
NFL Nation Blog – ESPN

Denver
Denver Broncos seasons
Denver Broncos